Josef Alexander Martínez Mencia (born 19 May 1993) is a Venezuelan professional footballer who plays as a striker for Major League Soccer club Inter Miami and the Venezuela national team.

Josef Martínez began his career with Caracas. In 2012, he was acquired by the Swiss Super League club Young Boys before spending a year on loan at Thun. In 2014, he was sold to Italian club Torino, and in 2017, Major League Soccer expansion side, Atlanta United FC. He holds the MLS record for career hat-tricks with six in his first 44 games, the record for cumulative goals in regular and post season with 35, the record for most consecutive games with a goal (15), and formerly held the record for goals in a single season (31 in 2018). Additionally, Martinez scored 100 goals in the MLS faster than any single player in league history (125 games).

In 2018, Martínez became the most decorated single-season player in MLS history by winning the League MVP, All-Star Game MVP, Golden Boot, and MLS Cup Final MVP.

He is a former Venezuela under-20 international. In 2011, he made his debut for the senior Venezuela national team against El Salvador, and has since represented his nation at three editions of the Copa América.

Club career

Caracas
Martínez made his debut for Caracas FC on 21 August 2010 against Estudiantes de Mérida, entering as a substitute in the 70th minute, won 1–0. He scored his first goal in a 2–2 draw against Deportivo Petare on 21 November 2010.

Young Boys
On 3 January 2012, Caracas announced Martínez had been sold to BSC Young Boys of the Swiss Super League for a period of four years along with fellow right-back Alexander Gonzalez. He debuted on 5 February 2012 against Servette FC, which the Young Boys won 3–1. After a string of good performances, Martínez was called up to the Venezuela national team, as well as awarded his first start for Young Boys on 21 October 2012, in which he scored his first goal for the Swiss club with a volley in the 50th minute against Grasshopper Club Zürich.

Loan to FC Thun 
After one season in the Swiss capital city, he was sent on loan to Thun. After scoring eight goals in 18 games with the team from Bernese Oberland, he was momentarily the top scorer in the Swiss Super League and recalled by Young Boys.

Torino
On 7 June 2014, Martínez was sold to Italian Serie A club Torino for a reported fee of €3 million. He made his debut in a 0–3 away win against Sweden's Brommapojkarna in the third round of the 2014–15 Europa League. He scored his first goal for the Granata in the return leg, won 4–0 in Turin (7–0 on agg.).

He made his league debut on 14 September in a 2–0 loss away to Sampdoria. On 7 December, he scored his first goal in Serie A during a 2–2 draw with Palermo. Four days later, he scored his first brace in the Europa League against Copenhagen, which ended 5–1 in favour of Torino.

On 30 April 2016, he scored his first brace in Serie A, as Torino won 5–1 away to Udinese.

Atlanta United

On 2 February 2017, Martínez was loaned with a buying option to Major League Soccer expansion team Atlanta United. He made his league debut on 5 March in a 2–1 home defeat against New York Red Bulls. He scored his first career hat-trick, and the first hat-trick in the history of the club, in a 6–1 win at Minnesota United the following week.

On 21 March, Atlanta announced they had activated the buyout clause for an undisclosed transfer fee. He was named the MLS Player of the Month for March after scoring five goals in his first three games in the league.

On 23 March, while playing for the Venezuela national team against Peru, Martínez injured his left quadricep. After more than two months of recuperation, he returned to action only to be injured again over the summer. Upon his return from the second injury, he scored hat tricks in two consecutive games against the New England Revolution and Orlando City, and was named the MLS Player of the Month for September 2017. Atlanta United finished in a tie for third in the Eastern Conference, but were eliminated in the first round of the MLS Cup Playoffs by Columbus Crew. Despite only making 20 appearances (all competitions) due to injury, Martínez finished his first year in Atlanta fourth in the league in scoring, with 20 goals in all competitions, and was named to the MLS Best XI for the 2017 season.

2018 season
On 2 June 2018, Martínez converted a late penalty kick against Philadelphia Union to notch his fifth MLS hat-trick, tying the league record for hat-tricks and doing so faster than any other player in league history. He broke the record for hat-tricks on 21 July 2018 against DC United, after only 44 games.

He was voted the MLS Player of the Month for July after scoring ten goals and adding one assist to lead the Five Stripes to a 3–1–1 record.

He scored the only goal for the MLS All-Stars in the 2018 MLS All-Star Game against Juventus, a 1–1 draw, and was named MVP.

On 24 August 2018, he scored his 28th goal of the season, a game winner in Orlando City, to break the league single-season record of 27, held by Roy Lassiter, Chris Wondolowski, and Bradley Wright-Phillips.  After failing to capitalize on numerous opportunities, Martínez utilized his quick footwork to cut back against the defender and then chip Joe Bendik to set the record in just his 26th match. He was named MLS Player of the Month for August 2018.

2019 season
On 6 August 2019, Martínez was awarded the MLS Player of the Month for July. He earned the award having scored in nine straight matches, tying his own MLS record set the previous season, which was also shared with Diego Valeri.

On 23 August, he set a new MLS record by scoring a goal in 12 consecutive games. The goal helped his side to a 1–0 win over rivals Orlando and was his 15th strike during the streak. On 18 September, Martínez extended his goal-scoring record to 15 consecutive games, which is the third longest streak in world football after Lionel Messi (33 goals in 21 games) and Tor Henning Hamre (21 goals in 15 games).

2020 season
On 29 February 2020, in Atlanta United’s first game of the 2020 season, Martínez suffered a torn ACL against MLS debutant Nashville SC. Martínez missed the entirety of the 2020 season.

2021 season 
Martínez made his first appearance since early last season on 6 April 2021 in the CONCACAF Champions League against Alajuelense, coming on as a 67th minute substitute in the 1–0 away victory. On 9 May 2021, Martínez scored his first goal of the season in a 1–1 draw against Inter Miami. In July 2021, after returning from Copa América, it was revealed by coach Gabriel Heinze that Martínez was training away from the team, with no specific reason given. Heinze was removed as Atlanta United's coach on 18 July and Martínez played his first match since returning on 21 July against FC Cincinnati. He came on as a substitute in the 1–1 draw.

On 30 July 2021, Martínez scored the opening goal for Atlanta United in the first minute of a 3–2 away defeat against Orlando City. He then scored the first goal for Atlanta on 4 August in their 2–2 draw against CF Montréal. Martínez also earned a red card in the 82nd minute following an altercation with Montréal's Victor Wanyama. He returned to the side on 15 August, scoring the only goal in a 1–0 home victory against Los Angeles FC.

2022 season 
Martínez scored his first goal of the 2022 season on 13 March 2022. After a second successful knee surgery, he started his first game since April, where he went on to score a goal and assisted another.

At the end of the season, after winning the award for the 2022 MLS Goal of the Year, Martínez did not renew his contract with Atlanta United, subsequently leaving the club after five years.

Inter Miami
On 18 January 2023, it was announced that Martínez had been traded to Inter Miami.

International career

Martínez made his international debut on 7 August 2011 against El Salvador as a substitute in the 76th minute.

On 10 November 2016 (matchday 11 of the 2018 FIFA World Cup qualification), Martínez scored a hat-trick against Bolivia in a 5–0 win in Maturín.

Style of play
While he started as a winger, a position in which he often played at Torino under Sinisa Mihajlovic, it was Gerardo Martino who changed his position, converting him into a center forward.
Primarily a forward, Martínez is an aggressive and powerful player, who usually plays in a central role as a main striker, but who is also capable of playing as a winger. His pace, dribbling ability, eye for goal, and his accurate finishing ability with either foot, as well as his head, combined with his ability to make attacking runs off the ball from behind and get into good positions, make him a dangerous attacking threat in the penalty area.

Career statistics

Club

International

Scores and results list Venezuela's goal tally first, score column indicates score after each Martínez goal.

Honours
Atlanta United
 MLS Cup: 2018
Eastern Conference: 2018
 U.S. Open Cup: 2019
 Campeones Cup: 2019

Individual
 MLS Best XI: 2017, 2018, 2019
 MLS Most Valuable Player: 2018
 MLS Golden Boot: 2018
 MLS All-Star: 2018, 2019
 MLS All-Star Game MVP: 2018
 MLS Player of the Month (6): March 2017, September 2017, July 2018, August 2018, July 2019, August 2019
 MLS Cup MVP: 2018
 MLS Goal of the Year: 2019, 2022

References

External links
Torino profile
Thun profile

1993 births
Living people
Sportspeople from Valencia, Venezuela
Venezuelan footballers
Association football forwards
Caracas FC players
BSC Young Boys players
FC Thun players
Torino F.C. players
Atlanta United FC players
Inter Miami CF players
Venezuelan Primera División players
Swiss Super League players
Serie A players
Major League Soccer players
Designated Players (MLS)
Venezuela under-20 international footballers
Venezuela international footballers
2015 Copa América players
Copa América Centenario players
2019 Copa América players
2021 Copa América players
Venezuelan expatriate footballers
Venezuelan expatriate sportspeople in Switzerland
Venezuelan expatriate sportspeople in Italy
Venezuelan expatriate sportspeople in the United States
Expatriate footballers in Switzerland
Expatriate footballers in Italy
Expatriate soccer players in the United States